Josephine Mason Wade Milligan (February 27, 1835 – July 5, 1911) was a botanist, wildflower collector, and writer who donated her herbarium to the Smithsonian Institution. Milligan lived in Jacksonville, Illinois where she founded the Jacksonville Sorosis in 1868, the oldest surviving women's literary society in the United States, and the Jacksonville Household Science Club in 1885. She was one of the earliest members of the Jacksonville Natural History Society, a member of the Microscopical Society, and a contributing writer to the New York Tribune. She was honored by the Illinois State Historical Society which created a miniature figurine of her which was displayed in the State Library.

Personal life
Milligan was born in Philadelphia, Pennsylvania to Nelson and Royina Mason Wade. She married Harvey William Milligan in Brownsport Furnace, Tennessee on March 16, 1856. They had five children, three of whom survived into adulthood: George, Josephine and Laurance.

References

External links
 Plant Catalog by Mrs. J M Milligan

1835 births
1911 deaths
People from Jacksonville, Illinois
Scientists from Illinois
Scientists from Philadelphia
Women botanists
19th-century American women scientists